Back in Your Life may refer to:

 Back in Your Life (Julian Austin album), 2000
 Back in Your Life (Jonathan Richman album), 1979